Raised by Wolves is a young adult fantasy novel series by Jennifer Lynn Barnes, published by EgmontUSA. The series consists of four books: Raised by Wolves (2010), Sweet Sixteen (2015), Trial by Fire (2011), and Take by Storm (2012).

Raised by Wolves 
Raised by Wolves was published June 8, 2010.

The book received a positive review from Booklist and a mixed review from Kirkus.

In 2010, Raise by Wolves was nominated for the Romantic Times Reviewers' Choice Award for Best Young Adult Paranormal/Fantasy Novel.

Sweet Sixteen 
Sweet Sixteen is a short story that takes place in the timeline between Raised by Wolves and Trial by Fire. It was published June 12, 2015.

Trial by Fire 
Trial by Fire was published June 14, 2011.

Taken by Storm 
Taken by Storm was published May 22, 2012.

References 

Novels set in Wyoming
Young adult fantasy novels
Novels set in Montana
Novels set in North Dakota
Egmont Books books